William George Neilson (February 16, 1862 – January 6, 1899) was a Canadian politician. He served in the Legislative Assembly of British Columbia from 1898 to 1899 from the electoral district of East Kootenay North. He died in office in 1899.

References

1862 births
1899 deaths